Pseudovermidae is a taxonomic family of minute sea slugs, specifically aolid nudibranchs, marine gastropod mollusk or micromollusks.

This family has no subfamilies.

These extremely small sea slugs are meiofauna; they live among sand grains.

Genera 
Genera within the family Pseudovermidae include:
 Pseudovermis Periaslavzeff, 1891 - type genus of the family Pseudovermidae

References